Maxville is an unincorporated community in Huff Township, Spencer County, in the U.S. state of Indiana.

History
Maxville was laid out in 1841. The community probably derives its name from the founder, James McDaniel.

Geography

References

Unincorporated communities in Spencer County, Indiana
Unincorporated communities in Indiana